The Ford Custom is an automobile which was produced by Ford in the United States, Canada and Australia in certain years from 1949 to 1981.

Custom and Custom Deluxe (1949-1951)
For the 1949 model year, the Custom nameplate was used for the top trim level in Ford's range automobile. It was part of the completely new redesign of Ford cars after the war. In 1950, it had a 114-inch wheelbase and 196.8-inch overall length. For 1950 the name was changed to Custom Deluxe  and then to Customline for 1952 when it moved to the midrange position between the new Mainline and Crestline models.

Customline (1952-1956)

Custom and Custom 300 (1957-1959)
The Custom name returned for the 1957 model year along with a new Custom 300 series, these two models sitting below the Fairlane and Fairlane 500. The base Custom was the bottom-rung model, whose primary customers were fleet buyers. The Custom 300 was a step up and intended for value-conscious customers. The Custom and Custom 300 generally replaced the fleet-oriented Mainline and mid-range Customline, respectively, from 1956.

The Custom 300 became the base model for 1958, but was dropped from the range for 1960.

Custom and Custom 500 (1964-1981)
From 1960 to 1963, the "Custom" and number-affixated variant nameplates were absent from the lineup, replaced by either Fairlane or base Galaxie models.  Base 1963 Fords were badged "Ford 300."

The Custom nameplate reappeared in 1964, once again on the economy line of models. As in 1957 and 1958, the Custom range consisted of two series: a base Custom range and a slightly better-trimmed Custom 500 series. Most Customs were sold to police and taxi fleets during the 1960s - although anyone who wanted basic, no-frills transportation in a full-sized car could purchase one - while the Custom 500 was marketed toward budget-conscious buyers who wanted a low-cost automobile but not a stripped model. Generally, the Custom 500 models were differentiated from their less-expensive stablemates by chrome fender trim, roof drip moldings, carpeting (although by the late 1960s, even base Customs had carpeting), upgraded cloth-and-vinyl upholstery, and minor convenience items.

Most Customs and Custom 500s were fitted either with a base inline six-cylinder engine or a small-block V8 engine (289 cid in the early years, up to 351 by the mid- to late-1970s), although the full range of V8 engines, up to the 425-horsepower 427 V8, and transmissions (from overdrive and 4-speed manual to SelectShift automatic) were available for law enforcement and performance-oriented customers who wanted the lightest car possible. As late as 1972, a powertrain combination of a six-cylinder engine and three-speed manual transmission was standard on the Custom and Custom 500 range; all V8-powered Customs had SelectShift made standard for the 1972 model year. Six cylinder engines and manual transmissions were dropped in 1973 due to the added weight of newly mandated 5 MPH numbers; all full-sized Fords from 1973 onward, including the Custom 500, had a V8 engine (351 cubic inches at its smallest) and SelectShift transmission standard.

The Custom was dropped after the 1972 model year, while the Custom 500 continued. For 1975, all full-size Fords were consolidated around the LTD nameplate, but the Custom 500 was brought back a few months into the model year. From 1976 onward it was only available in the US for fleet customers. The Custom 500 continued to be sold to retail customers in Canada and the nameplate was used there through 1981. In the United States, the Custom 500 was replaced on the new downsized Panther vehicles by the LTD "S."

The companion station wagon series sold with Custom and Custom 500 trim was the Ranch Wagon. Like the coupe and sedan models, these cars were intended for fleet buyers.

1979–1981 (Canada only)
The 1979 Custom 500 for the Canadian market was completely redesigned with the advent of the Panther platform, and had the base-model 1979 Ford LTD front end (with single rectangular headlights and inboard parking lights on a grille distinct from the upper-trimmed LTD Landau/Crown Victoria). The standard powertrain in 1979 was a  V8 with SelectShift transmission, while a  Windsor V8 was optional. For 1980, to meet EPA CAFE standards, a  V8 was made standard, with the 302 and 351 V8 engines optional.

Production
Approximately 7,850,000 full-size Fords and Mercurys were sold over 1969-78. This makes it the tenth best selling automobile platform in history.

Australian production
The Ford Custom Fordor was produced in Australia from September 1949, and Australian content on the locally produced Custom had reached 80% by 1950. A coupe utility variant was also offered by Ford Australia, initially as the Ford Coupe Utility, and later as the Ford De Luxe Coupe Utility.

The 1959 model North American Custom 300 was also produced by Ford Australia from September 1959. Offered only as a four-door sedan and only with a  V8 engine, it was given a mild makeover in late 1960 which included the grille design from the 1959 Canadian Meteor. The facelifted model continued in production through to 1962.

References

Custom